Khalid Mubarak Al-Naemi (born 22 October 1998), is a Qatari professional footballer who plays as a defender.

Career
Khlaid started his career at the youth team of Al-Sadd and represented the club at every level except the senior level.

Career statistics

Club

References

External links
 

1998 births
Living people
Qatari footballers
Association football defenders
Al Sadd SC players
Al-Arabi SC (Qatar) players
Qatar Stars League players